A reference scenario is an imagined situation where a library patron brings a question to a librarian and there is then a conversation, called in the field a reference interview, where the librarian works to help the patron find the information they want.  These scenarios are used in training future librarians how to help patrons.  Basically, a scenario is as short as a couple of sentences, including a question and a situation that underlies that question.

A great deal of reference teaching puts students to researching the answers to made-up questions.  This focuses the student on learning about the reference sources at hand by using them to answer those questions.  Scenarios are something different.  They focus the student on the interaction with patrons.  In class practice sessions, one student can be the patron and the other the librarian, as long as the one practicing as the librarian doesn't know the whole scenario in advance.

Scenarios are valued because often the question asked is not the end of the patron's information hunt, but the start.  Patrons often start by voicing a question that they think the library can answer, rather than the question they are really seeking to answer.  Or they pose a question that the librarian doesn't understand.  Reference librarian skills are very much about mediating a gap between what the patron wants and what the library can provide.  This can involve the librarian making him or herself a partner in the patron's search, teaching them what the library really has to offer, or even just clarifying a confusing word: Does the patron want information about soaps to clean with or soaps as in soap operas?

See also 

Reference work
Library reference desk

Further reading 

 Ross, Catherine, Kirsti Nilsen, and Patricia Dewdney. Conducting the Reference Interview: A How-To-Do-It Manual for Librarians.  New York: Neal Schumann, 2002.

Reference
Library science education